Salvatore Falco is an Italian journalist. He won a national journalism prize in 2006.

Falco took part in the investigative journalism show Lavori in Corso (Work in Progress), during which he conducted journalistic investigation about illegal immigrants. The resulting documentary was entitled New Slaves.

References

External links
Linkedin page

Living people
Italian journalists
Italian male journalists
Year of birth missing (living people)